The following List of hospitals in the U.S. state of Minnesota is given in the order of the city where the hospital is or was located.  It is also sortable by county, name, health system, and number of staffed beds.  Hospitals that have closed are notated with the year of closing.  Minnesota's oldest hospital is M Health Fairview's St. Joseph's Hospital in St. Paul, which first opened in 1853 in the Minnesota Territory.  The largest hospital in terms of staffed beds, is Mayo Clinic Hospital - Rochester, which was founded in 1864 by William and Charlie Mayo and has a total of 2,014 beds -  (1,220 beds at its St. Marys campus and 794 at its Methodist campus).  There are twice as many rural hospitals as urban hospitals in Minnesota.  In 2017, Minnesota hospitals provided 536,375 inpatient visits and nearly 12.7 million outpatient visits.

Hospitals 

According to the Minnesota Department of Health, there were 130 state licensed hospitals with 16,140 beds in 2019. There were an additional six federally licensed hospitals in Minnesota.

Notes:

Minnesota trauma centers

Defunct hospitals
 Abbott Hospital, Minneapolis, merged with Northwestern Hospital in 1980
 Albany Area Hospital and Medical Center, Albany,  closed in 2015
 Albert Lea Hospital and Clinic, Albert Lea, (Mayo Clinic Health System), closed in 2019
 Asbury Hospital, near Elliot Park in Minneapolis, 350 beds, became United States Veterans Hospital Number 68 in 1921 
 Eitel Hospital, Minneapolis, closed in 1985
 Fergus Falls Regional Treatment Center, Fergus Falls, closed in 2005
 Glen Lake Sanatorium, Minnetonka, closed in 1976
 Dr. E.P. Hawkins Clinic, Hospital, and House, Montrose
 Lakeside Medical Center, Pine City, closed in 2010
 Mayo Clinic Health System Springfield, Springfield, HOSP-24, closed in 2020
 Metropolitan Medical Center, Minneapolis, merged with Mount Sinai Hospital (Minneapolis) in 1990 and closed in 1991 - buildings taken over by Hennepin County Medical Center
 Midway Hospital, St. Paul, closed in 1997
 Minnesota Correctional Facility – Faribault (former mental hospital), closed in 1989
 Minnesota Correctional Facility – Willow River/Moose Lake (former Moose Lake Regional Treatment Center), Moose Lake, closed in 1988
 Minnesota State Sanatorium for Consumptives, Walker, closed in 2008
 Mount Sinai Hospital, Minneapolis, merged with Metropolitan Medical Center (Minneapolis) in 1990 and closed in 1991 
 Ripley Memorial Hospital, Minneapolis, closed before 2007
 Rudolph Latto House, Hastings, closed in 1949
 St. Ansgar Hospital, Moorhead, closed in 1990
 St. Joseph's Hospital, St. Paul, closed in December 2020
 St. Mary’s Hospital, Winstead, closed in 1989
 Tanner's Hospital, Ely
 Thompson–Fasbender House, Hastings, closed in 1953

Psychiatric hospitals and centers 
 Anoka Metro Regional Treatment Center, Anoka
 Fergus Falls Regional Treatment Center, Fergus Falls (Closed in 2005)
 Minnesota Security Hospital (formerly St. Peter State Hospital), St. Peter
 Sanford Health Behavioral Health Center, Thief River Falls, PSY-HOSP-16

Health care systems 

The following health care systems are located in Minnesota:

 Allina Health
 Alomere Health
 Altru Health System
 Avera Health
 Catholic Health Initiatives (CHI)
 CentraCare Health
 Children's Minnesota
 Essentia Health
 Gillette Children's Specialty Healthcare
 Gundersen Health System
 HealthPartners
 HealthEast Care System (Defunct 2019 - now part of M Health Fairview)
 Hennepin Healthcare
 Indian Health Services
 Lake Region Healthcare
 Lakewood Health System
 Mayo Clinic Health System
 M Health Fairview
 North Memorial Health
 Riverwood Healthcare Center
 Sanford Health
 Shriners Children's
 St. Francis Regional Medical Center (Minnesota)
 Wilderness Health

References

Bibliography

 

Minnesota
 List of hospitals in Minnesota
Hospitals